The following lists events that happened during 1962 in the Yemen Arab Republic.

Events

September
 September 25-26: 1962 Yemeni coup d'état
 September 27 - North Yemen declares its independence from the United Kingdom and becomes the Yemen Arab Republic.

References

 
1960s in North Yemen
Years of the 20th century in North Yemen
North Yemen
North Yemen